Altrincham Kersal Rugby Football Club is an English rugby union team based in Timperley, Trafford. The club runs three senior men's teams, and mini and junior rugby from age 5. The first XV currently plays in North 1 West, a level six league in the English league system, following the club's promotion as champions of Lancs/Cheshire 1 at the end of the 2018–19 season.

Club honours
North-West East 1 champions: 1991–92
Lancs/Cheshire 1 champions (3): 1996–97, 2014–15, 2018–19
Cheshire Plate winners: 1998
North Division 1 West champions (2): 2003–04, 2010–11
Cheshire Vase winners (2): 2011, 2014

Notable players

England
The following Altrincham Kersal players have represented England at full international level.

 Frank Handford
 Mark Cueto
 John Orwin

British and Irish Lions
The following Altrincham Kersal players have also represented the British and Irish Lions.

 Frank Handford: 1910
 Mark Cueto

References

External links
Official club website

English rugby union teams
1897 establishments in England
Rugby clubs established in 1897
Sport in Trafford
Altrincham